Leigh Jamieson (born 30 July 1985) is an English professional ice hockey player currently playing for Milton Keynes Lightning in the National Ice Hockey League (NIHL).

Jamieson began his career with his hometown Milton Keynes Kings and also played for England Under 20's before joining another MK team the Milton Keynes Lightning.  He then signed with Elite League team the Belfast Giants where he was a key member of their squad and helped them with the Elite League title in 2006.  His performances for the Giants also earned him a place in the Great Britain national ice hockey team.  After five seasons with the Giants he signed for the Coventry Blaze.  In 2009, Jamieson returned home and re-signed with the Milton Keynes Lightning, helping them win the EPIHL title that season and has made the EPIHL First All-Star team in three successive seasons.

After a spells with Peterborough Phantoms and Streatham IHC, Jamieson re-joined Milton Keynes Lightning in 2019. He then agreed to remain with the Lightning ahead of the 2020-21 season.

References

External links

1985 births
Belfast Giants players
Coventry Blaze players
English ice hockey forwards
Living people
Milton Keynes Kings players
Milton Keynes Lightning players
Peterborough Phantoms players